In New England, a warrant is a document issued by the Board of Selectmen to call a town meeting.

Warrants essentially list an agenda of items to be voted on by those present.  In towns with an open town meeting, those present would consist of any and all registered voters in the town.  In towns with a representative town meeting, anyone may attend, but only town meeting members (elected representatives) are allowed to vote.

Items on the agenda generally vary significantly, from the annual operating budget of the town to adjustment of by-laws, and anything else that may legally come before the meeting.

In Massachusetts, residents may place articles on the warrant without approval by the Selectmen by petitioning to insert the same.  Petitions to insert an article on the warrant for an Annual Town Meeting require ten signatures.  Petitions to insert an article on the warrant for a Special Town Meeting require 100 signatures or the signatures of ten per cent of the registered voters in the town, whichever is less.

New England
Local government in Massachusetts